Wildlife and Countryside Link (Link) brings together voluntary organisations in the UK to protect and enhance wildlife, landscape and the marine environment and to further the quiet enjoyment and appreciation of the countryside. Link currently has 49 members who collectively employ 9,600 full-time staff, have the help of 170,000 volunteers and the support of over 8 million people in the UK. Members are united by their common interest in the conservation and enjoyment of the natural and historic environment.

Aims
Link aims to maximise the efficiency and effectiveness of the environmental voluntary sector through collaboration. By bringing members together on policy areas of interest to them, it provides a forum to develop a collective view on national and international issues affecting wildlife and the countryside, to exchange information, and to work together to develop policies to influence domestic and relevant EU and international policies.  By working together, Link can provide its members with a stronger single voice to effect policy change.

Activities
Information Management

Link provides an information management service helping members to share resources and intelligence. By acting as a hub through which information can be exchanged, Link enables members to network with other organisations with similar interests and keeps them informed of developments across a range of topics.

Coalition Building

Link facilitates collaborative work between members by helping to distil a clear common message on important issues and communicate it effectively to key decision makers. As an independent forum, priorities can be agreed and joint positions on environmental issues can be developed. Link acts as an 'honest broker' where members may have different views about particular issues and it helps members to synchronise public campaigns to achieve maximum impact.

Structure
Governance

Link is run by a small professional Secretariat that is overseen by a Management Committee of senior representatives elected from the membership.  The Link Secretariat co-ordinates groups of experts in Working Groups and Task Forces, and facilitates coalition working through these groups with the help of elected Chairs and Vice-Chairs.

Link has three honorary Vice-Presidents appointed from the three main parliamentary parties, on whose support Link calls when engaging in parliamentary activity. The current Vice-President is Baroness Miller of Chilthorne Domer.

Link is a registered charity number 1107460 and a company limited by guarantee registered in England and Wales number 3889519.

Members

As of November 2018, 49 groups were members of Link:

A Rocha UK
ALERC 
Amphibian and Reptile Conservation
Badger Trust
Bat Conservation Trust

British Ecological Society
Born Free Foundation
British Canoeing
British Mountaineering Council
Buglife - The Invertebrate Conservation Trust
Butterfly Conservation
Campaign for National Parks
Campaign to Protect Rural England
ClientEarth
Council for British Archaeology
Earth Watch Institute
Environmental Investigation Agency
Four Paws UK
Forest Stewardship Council
Freshwater Biological Association
Freshwater Habitats Trust (formerly Pond Conservation)
Friends of the Earth
Greenpeace
Hawk and Owl Trust
Humane Society International/UK
Institute of Fisheries Management
International Fund for Animal Welfare
The Mammal Society
Marine Conservation Society
MARINElife
National Trust
Open Spaces Society
ORCA
People's Trust for Endangered Species
Plantlife
Ramblers
The Rivers Trust (formerly the Association of Rivers Trusts)
Royal Society for the Protection of Birds 
Royal Society for the Prevention of Cruelty to Animals
Salmon and Trout Association
Shark Trust
UFAW
Whale and Dolphin Conservation Society
Wildfowl and Wetlands Trust
The Wildlife Trusts
Woodland Trust
World Society for the Protection of Animals
World Wide Fund for Nature
Zoological Society of London

Joint Links

Wildlife and Countryside Link is based in London and focuses its efforts on influencing Westminster and Whitehall. There are other Links in each of the devolved administrations:

Northern Ireland Environment Link
Wales Environment Link
Scottish Environment Link

History
Link began life as Wildlife Link in 1980, taking over from two existing umbrella bodies, the Council for Nature and the Council for Environmental Conservation.  The formation of Link was driven by Lord Peter Melchett whose position in the House of Lords convinced him that better co-ordination was needed between voluntary organisations with similar core objectives. In 1982 Countryside Link was formed to look after the interests of the countryside and in 1990 the two organisations merged creating the organisation of today, whose interests span the breadth of wildlife and countryside issues.

Funding
Link's members provide the majority share of Link's core income through an annual subscription and voluntary donations. Financial support is also gratefully received from Natural England, the Esmée Fairbairn Foundation, and the Tubney Charitable Trust.

References

Wildlife and Countryside Link

External links
 Official website
Current work
Achievements
Publications
Northern Ireland Environment Link
Wales Environment Link
Scottish Environment Link

Environmental organisations based in the United Kingdom
Animal charities based in the United Kingdom
Wildlife of the United Kingdom
Environmental organizations established in 1980
1980 establishments in England
1980 establishments in the United Kingdom